Gornji Bogićevci is a municipality in Brod-Posavina County, Croatia. There are 1,975 inhabitants of which 89% declare themselves Croats (2011 census).

References

Municipalities of Croatia
Populated places in Brod-Posavina County